Woman Reading a Letter may refer to:
 Woman Reading a Letter (Metsu), a mid-1660s painting by Gabriël Metsu 
 Woman Reading a Letter (Vermeer), a painting from around 1663 by Johannes Vermeer